A military counteroffensive was launched by Ukraine on 29 August 2022 to expel Russian forces occupying the southern regions of Kherson and Mykolaiv oblasts.

Military analysts consider the counteroffensive to be the third strategic phase of the war in Ukraine, along with the concurrent eastern counteroffensive, after the initial invasion and the Battle of Donbas.

After many strikes against Russian military targets, Ukraine announced the start of a full-scale counteroffensive on 29 August 2022. On 9 October, Ukraine said it recaptured 1,170 square kilometers of land. On 9 November, Russian troops were ordered to withdraw from Kherson, the only regional capital captured since the start of the invasion. Ukrainian forces liberated the city of Kherson two days later, on 11 November.

Background

Russian offensive 

During the 2022 Southern Ukraine offensive, Russian troops invaded the Kherson, Zaporizhzhia, and Mykolaiv Oblasts. In the early days of the war, Russian troops captured several cities in Southern Ukraine, including Melitopol and Kherson, pushing Ukrainian troops back to the city of Mykolaiv. The Russian forces originally aimed towards capturing the major port city of Odesa from the southeast, but were forced back following their defeat at the Battle of Voznesensk, and ultimately only succeeded in occupying a small part of Mykolaiv Oblast, most notably Snihurivka. In Zaporizhzhia Oblast, Russian troops pushed north and successfully defeated Ukrainian servicemen at the Battle of Enerhodar, thus seizing the city and the adjacent Zaporizhzhia Nuclear Power Plant, the largest nuclear plant in continental Europe. Russian forces also pushed east, reaching the Donetsk/Zaporizhzhia administrative borders, thereby creating a land bridge connecting Crimea with the Russian mainland.

Russian occupation 

Russian forces began an occupation of Kherson Oblast on 2 March, and the occupation authorities immediately began to consolidate their control over these territories. The authorities reportedly erected a statue of Vladimir Lenin in the town square, introduced Russian curriculum to the local school system, rerouted internet servers to Russia, issued Russian passports, and began circulating the Ruble. There were also widespread allegations of Russian authorities abducting hundreds of Ukrainian civilians across occupied territories. By early July, Russia controlled 95% of Kherson Oblast, 70% of Zaporizhzhia Oblast and 10% of Mykolaiv Oblast.

Annexation 

In late May, Russian government officials acknowledged plans to annex all three oblasts and were reportedly setting conditions on occupied territory within Zaporizhzhia. A referendum was reportedly planned by Russian occupation authorities in the region for late 2022 to annex Kherson and Zaporizhzhia oblasts, while the occupied parts of the Mykolaiv Oblast would be included in the Kherson MSA, but officials soon moved the date forwards to autumn amid fears of being set back by the Ukrainian Army, according to U.K. intelligence officials. These referendums were held from 23–27 September, with Russia officially annexing Donetsk, Luhansk, Zaporizhzhia and Kherson Oblasts about a week later  on 5 October. Western governments denounced the referendums as illegitimate and refused to recognize its results, and their illegitimacy was later confirmed with the adoption of United Nations General Assembly Resolution ES-11/4.

Ukrainian counterattacks 
By 11 March the Russian offensive had stalled on numerous fronts within Mykolaiv Oblast, prompting gradual retreat by the end of the month. In April, Ukrainian authorities said they had pushed the enemy southwards to the border with Kherson Oblast.

On 18 April, Russian, DPR, and LPR forces launched the Battle of Donbas, requiring some of their forces to be transferred to the east. The Ukrainian military took advantage with attacks in the Kherson and Zaporizhzhia oblasts, forcing Russian troops out or several fortified positions south of the Inhulets river. In late May, Ukraine launched minor attacks on the border between Zaporizhzhia and Donetsk Oblasts.

By 1 June, the Institute for the Study of War had assessed that Ukrainian counterattacks in Kherson Oblast had successfully disrupted Russian ground lines of communication along the Inhulets river. Throughout June, small parts of northwestern Kherson and northern Zaporizhzhia oblasts were regained by Ukrainian forces, with fierce fighting around Davydiv Brid. However, the main line of Russian defenses did not retreat as initially planned. Before 9 July, Ukraine had conducted numerous small counterattacks on Russian forces, pushing them into defensive positions. By 25 July, the region's military governor claimed that Ukraine had retaken 44 towns and villages, or 15 percent of the region's territory.

Partisan warfare 

There were numerous reports of partisan warfare within the occupied territories. In the city of Melitopol, Ukrainian resistance leaders claimed to have killed 100 Russian soldiers by 5 June. In Kherson, Ukrainian sources claimed that resistance fighters bombed a café frequented by Russian troops, killing Russian collaborators and destroying Russian military infrastructure. Assassination attempts and bombings have also been carried out on collaborators. On 30 August, shootouts and explosions were recorded in the city, which Russian officials attributed to "spies and saboteurs."

Prelude 
Ukrainian officials first hinted at a large-scale military offensive in mid-to-late June, saying that "visible results" should be expected from Ukrainian counteroffensives by August 2022. A Ukrainian general stated on 15 June that if Ukraine were supplied sufficient weapons, it would be able to mount a massive counteroffensive by the summer.

On 5 July, Ukraine launched a major bombing campaign against Russian outposts in Melitopol, reportedly killing 200 soldiers.  On 7 July, Ukraine retook Snake Island, affording Ukraine access to valuable sea channels and grain export lanes.

Meanwhile, Russia tried to strengthen its hold on Kherson and Zaporizhzhia Oblasts. Russia stated that babies born in Kherson Oblast would automatically receive Russian citizenship, implying that Kherson was a part of the Russian Federation.

Speculation of counteroffensive 
In the morning of 9 July, Ukrainian government authorities began to urge residents of Kherson and Zaporizhzhia Oblasts to evacuate from their homes due to an impending Ukrainian counteroffensive. Residents of occupied Kherson in particular were urged to create shelters to "survive the Ukrainian counteroffensive". Iryna Vereshchuk, Ukrainian deputy prime minister and Minister of Reintegration of Temporarily Occupied Territories, warned of intense fighting and shelling in the upcoming days, claiming that the "ZSU is coming".

On 9 July, Ukrainian president Volodymyr Zelenskyy ordered the Ukrainian military, including elements of Operational Command South, to retake occupied territory. On the same day, Ukrainian Minister of Defense Oleksii Reznikov stated that Ukraine was amassing a million-strong fighting force for the offensive. Later, Reznikov said that there was a misunderstanding during his interview, and that 1 million is the total manpower of the Ukrainian "security and defense sector". He also denied that there was a "specific offensive operation".

On 24 July, Serhiy Khlan, a Kherson region official, stated that "the Kherson region will definitely be liberated by September, and all the occupiers' plans will fail."

Writing a few months later in The Atlantic, military historian Phillips O'Brien remarked that it was unusual for a side to openly signal an intended offensive. He suggested that by encouraging the Russians to bring soldiers to the western side of the Dneiper and then attacking the bridges, it was creating a trap for them.

Early engagements 

In early July, the Ukrainian army engaged in minor skirmishes with Russian forces. Ukrainian troops struck Nova Kakhovka, a Russian command post in Kherson city, with HIMARS missiles, and claimed it killed 12 officers and a Russian major general. By the afternoon, Ukrainian authorities claimed that Russian forces were transferring equipment to the left bank of the Dnieper, creating roadblocks within Kherson city in preparation for street battles. Ukrainian authorities urged civilians in Zaporizhzhia Oblast to evacuate, suggesting that a major counteroffensive was soon to come. On 13 July, the head of the Kherson regional military administration claimed that Ukraine launched counterattacks along the entire Mykolaiv-Kherson-Zaporizhzhia front line.

Ukraine continued to strike Russian targets and approach towards Kherson over the next week.

Preparation phase and initial offensive announcements

According to a 24 July statement by Kherson Region official Serhiy Khlan, Ukrainian attacks damaging Antonivka Road Bridge and another key bridge, and attacks on Russian ammunition stores and command posts, were preparatory actions for the offensive. A day earlier, Khlan stated that Ukrainian forces had retaken several villages in Kherson Oblast, but that the Ukrainian authorities requested civilians not to publish information on the progress of the campaign prior to official statements. On 26 July, Antonivka Road Bridge was hit again by a Ukrainian HIMARS missile strike. The bridge remained structurally intact while the bridge's roadway surface was damaged.

On 27 July 2022, Ukrainian forces stated that they had retaken control of the villages of Lozove and Andriivka, both on the eastern side of the Inhulets river, in Beryslav Raion in Kherson Oblast. In the next months, Ukrainian forces launched a series of limited ground attacks as well as several air and rocket attacks on Russian targets in southern Ukraine. On 9 August, explosions heavily damaged the Russian airbase at Novofedorivka, Crimea. An anonymous Western official stated that the explosions, possibly caused by a Ukrainian attack, had "put more than half of [the Russian] Black Sea fleet's naval aviation combat jets out of use."

Though these Ukrainian attacks were met with some success, they did not cripple Russian defenses in the south or achieve a breakthrough. On 10 August, an unnamed Ukrainian military official told Politico that the counteroffensive had begun in earnest on 9 August. However, Al Jazeera argued that both sides had seemingly fought each other to a standstill, with a major Ukrainian offensive not materializing.

Preceding Russian offensive in the south
On 20 August, Russian forces launched a minor offensive in southern Ukraine, with Ukrainian sources admitting that Russian forces had advanced and made gains in the towns of Blahodatne and Vasylky in Mykolaiv Oblast. On August 22, Russian forces achieved some success east of the city of Mykolaiv and in northwestern Kherson Oblast, driving Ukrainian forces 36 km from the front line to the north and 28 km deep into the territory of Mykolaiv Oblast with two objectives, to force a westward direction towards the city Mykolaiv or in a northerly direction towards the Dnipropetrovsk Oblast with the intention of capturing the city of Kryvyi Rih, which hosts a strong Ukrainian troop concentration, and from where a counter-offensive on Kherson, Melitopol, Enerhodar, Berdyansk and Crimea is planned. On the same day, Russian forces took control of Blahodatne (referred to by the Russian Ministry of Defense as Komsomolsky) about 45 km east of the town of Mykolaiv and a 12 square kilometer zone of control.

On August 23, the Russian Ministry of Defense announced that Russian forces had advanced northwest of Aleksandrovka, approximately 38 km west of the city of Kherson, and had reached the administrative border of Kherson-Mykolaiv Oblast. Ukrainian troops retaliated with artillery strikes on the site of the Russian 247th Airborne Regiment of the 7th Guards Air Assault Division and the ammunition depot in Chornobaivka. The same day, Russian forces continued air and artillery strikes on Dnipropetrovsk, Kryvyi Rih, and Mykolaiv with Uragan rockets.

From 24 to 25 August, the Russian forces continued their attacks but made no further progress. On 27 August, Russian and Ukrainian forces clashed at Potomkyne in northwestern Kherson Oblast; both sides claimed that they had repelled an attack. Meanwhile, Russia and Ukraine continued to conduct air strikes in the area, with Ukraine's Southern Operational Command claiming successful hits on three river crossings (Antonivka and Darivka bridges, and the Kakhovka Hydroelectric Power Plant) and two Russian battalion tactical groups.

The Institute for the Study of War has credited the Ukrainian southern offensive with allowing the Kharkiv offensive to be so successful. Writing: “Kyiv's long discussion and then an announcement of a counter-offensive operation aimed at Kherson Oblast drew substantial Russian troops away from the sectors on which Ukrainian forces have conducted decisive attacks in the past several days,”

Counteroffensive

August
On 29 August, Zelenskyy announced the start of a full-scale counteroffensive to retake Russian-occupied territory in the south, a claim that was corroborated by the Ukrainian parliament as well as Operational Command South.

At the start of the operation, the Ukrainian operational group "Kakhovka" and some Ukrainian officials claimed that their forces had broken through defensive lines manned by the 109th DPR Regiment and Russian paratroopers. The 109th DPR Regiment was a conscript unit which was known to serve on garrison duty in the Kherson area. Ukrainian officials also claimed that they had hit and destroyed a large Russian base in the area amid a general increase of Ukrainian air and artillery bombardments of Russian positions. The authorities in occupied Kherson called these claims "fake" and "an illusion", but also announced a workplace evacuation from Nova Kakhova following Ukrainian missile strikes. Locals reported heavy fighting across the Kherson frontline, while electrical networks temporarily failed and evacuations of civilians took place. An NPR journalist in the area confirmed the increased intensity of combat and that more Ukrainian forces were moving to the frontline. The Ukrainian government and military largely refused to talk about territorial changes on the offensive's first day, though anonymous Ukrainian officials, Western journalists and a number of Russian milbloggers reported that Ukrainian troops had captured several settlements north and northwest of Kherson, at a bridgehead across the Inhulets River, as well as south of the Kherson-Dnipropetrovsk Oblast border. Among these were the villages of Sukhyi Stavok, Arkhanhelske,  and Pravdyne. The Ukrainians also attacked Russian pontoon ferries on the Dnipro River.

By 30 August, Russia was beginning to direct large numbers of troops and equipment to the Kherson frontline to counter the Ukrainian offensive. Meanwhile, Ukraine intensified its attacks on Russian concentration points, ammunition depots, bridges and other targets. In Kherson city, there were reports of fighting between Ukrainian partisans and pro-Russian security forces. According to Pantelis Boubouras, Greece's honorary consul in Kherson, the Ukrainians had relatively easily broken the Russian first line of defense near Kherson city, but had encountered much stiffer resistance at the Russian second line of defense in the area. By 31 August, this second line was the main focus of combat, with Boubouras stating that local sources had informed that both sides were suffering heavy losses. However, a Russian milblogger reported that Ukrainians were making progress toward Vysokopillia further north, though the overall situation at the northern frontline remained unclear. Milbloggers also claimed that the Russians had been able to stabilize the frontline at Oleksandrivka as well as Blahodatne, but had failed when attempting to retake Myrne. Ukrainian advances were also reported at Ternovi Pody and Lyubomyrivka. Later that day, Ukrainian sources claimed that four small villages had already been retaken, though Ukrainian soldiers also stated their opinion that this operation was not a large counteroffensive but rather a localized operation. Ukrainian Presidential Advisor Oleksiy Arestovych cautioned that the offensive was going to be a "slow operation to grind the enemy", not a quick and massive campaign.

September

From 1 to 2 September, Russian milbloggers reported further Ukrainian advances, but also a series of successful Russian counter-attacks. Many villages were reportedly contested. On 2 September, a day of mourning was declared by Ukrainian authorities in Zaporitzhya, after the heavy losses suffered by the native 128th Mountain Assault Brigade during the opening days of the offensive. On 3 September, the British Ministry of Defence said that Ukrainian forces had made three main lines of attack in Kherson Oblast, and had a military advantage of tactical surprise as a result of Russian commanders' mistakes and Russian logistical problems. Ukrainian forces destroyed Russian pontoon bridges. There was gunfire near the centre of Kherson city. On the same day, Russian milbloggers claimed that Ukrainian troops had captured Blahodativka village and withdrawn from a few positions near Sukhyi Stavok.

On 4 September, president Zelenskyy announced the liberation of two villages in Kherson Oblast and one in Donetsk Oblast. Ukrainian authorities released a photo showing the raising of the Ukrainian flag in Vysokopillia by Ukrainian forces. On 6 September, Ukraine started a second offensive in the Kharkiv area, where it achieved a rapid breakthrough. Meanwhile, Ukrainian attacks also continued along the southern frontline, though reports about territorial changes were largely unverifiable.

On 12 September, President Zelenskyy said that Ukrainian forces have retaken a total of 6,000 sq km from Russia, in the both the south and the east. The BBC stated that it could not verify these claims.

On 13 September, that Russian forces had withdrawn from Kyselivka, a settlement 15 km from Kherson. On the same day, the Russia-backed deputy head of the Kherson Region posted a video from the outskirts of the settlement in which he claimed that Ukrainian troops have not been able to enter it. The mayor of Melitopol reported that Russian forces were abandoning the city and were moving to Russian-held Crimea. Ukraine also claimed to have retaken Oleksandrivka on 13 September. A local official claimed that Ukraine has retaken Kyselivka, but this was unable to be confirmed by September 14. In order to slow down the Ukrainian advance, Russian forces blew up a dam at the Inhulets river, flooding parts of the frontline.

By 24 September, U.S. officials assessed that the Russian situation at the Kherson frontline was deteriorating, with the local troops suffering from poor morale and largely cut off from supply lines due to the loss of bridges across the Dnipro River. Russian military commanders had reportedly requested to retreat to more defensible positions, but President Putin had intervened and forbidden any retreat which would give up Kherson city.

October
On 2 October, just two days after Russia's annexation of Kherson along with the Zaporizhzhia, Luhansk and Donetsk regions, and a day after Ukrainian forces recaptured the strategic Lyman railway junction in the Donetsk region, Ukrainian forces started the counteroffensive along the line from Arkhanhelske to Osokorivka in the Kherson region south of the Kherson-Dnipropetrovsk border. They moved south along the west bank of the Dnieper and retook Zolota Balka as well as Mikhailivka and advanced further south to the next target, Dudchany. Ukrainian President Volodymyr Zelensky announced that Ukrainian forces liberated Myrolyubivka (23 km northwest of Kherson City) and Arkhanhelske on the Inhulets River south of the Kherson-Dnipropetrovsk Oblast border. The installed Russian head of the Kherson region, Volodymyr Saldo, said that "in that region there was a breakthrough" and called the situation "tense".

By 3 October, the Russian army was being enveloped in Northern Kherson, with Ukrainian troops trying to reach Beryslav. Ukrainian forces continued to advance south in the direction of Nova Kakhovka, and geolocated footage showed that they liberated Mykhailivka, Havrylivka, and Novooleksandrivka along the T0403. Social media footage and Russian milblogger discourse also indicated that Ukrainian forces made advances west of the T0403 highway, liberating Khreschenivka on 1 October. Russian sources also reported that Ukrainian forces liberated settlements on the Lyubomyrivka-Bilaivka-Novoolesandrivka line. The offensive continued southwards with towns of Davydiv Brid, Velyka Oleksandrivka and Dudchany reported as liberated 4 October. On 5 October, the pro-Russian deputy head of the Kherson region, Kirill Stremousov, stated that Russian forces were "regrouping" in order to "strike back" at Ukrainian troops; he added that the Ukrainian advance had been "halted" and therefore it was "not possible" for the AFU to break through to the city of Kherson. The same day, Russian officers were reported as withdrawing from Snihurivka while some troops remained. The Ukrainian side was seeking confirmation.

By 4 October, as confirmed by Institute for the Study of War (ISW), several Russian and Ukrainian sources reported that Ukrainian forces captured Davydiv Brid, Mala Oleksandrivka, Velyka Oleksandrivka, Novodmytrivka, Starosiliya, Novomykhailivka, Dudchany on the shore of the Kakhovka Reservoir, Chereshneve, Novovoskresenske, Maiske, Petropavlivka, Trinofivka, Novavasilievka, Chervone, Novohryhorivka, Nova Kamyanka, Pyatykhatky, Sablukivka, and Kachkarivka after Russian forces abandoned them to avoid encirclement on 4 October. A total area of 2,400 square kilometers in the south of Ukraine had been liberated since the beginning of the war. Ukrainian forces reached the village of Novopetrivka. Novovasylivka, Novohryhorivka, Nova Kamyanka, Tryfonivka and Chervone in the Beryslav Raion were officially under the control of Ukrainian forces as late as 12 October.

On 13 October, the Russian government announced evacuation of the civilian population in the city of Kherson, after a request by the Russia-installed head of Kherson Oblast Volodymyr Saldo.

On 15 October, a major Ukrainian counteroffensive resumed on the northern Kherson front in the direction of Dudchany, Mylove and Sukhanovi. On 18 October, General Sergei Surovikin, the new commander of Russian forces in Ukraine, said in Russian TV that the defence of Kherson was "not easy" and that “The enemy continually attempts to attack the positions of Russian troops.” Michael Clarke projected that the Ukrainians were engaged in a Suppression of Enemy Air Defenses (SEAD) operation over Kherson Oblast.

On 22 October Russian occupation authorities urged residents in the city of Kherson to "leave immediately" citing what they called the tense military situation. That same day, unconfirmed reports emerged of Mylove being captured by Ukraine.

In late October 2022, Ramzan Kadyrov acknowledged the deaths of 23 Kadyrovites and the injury of 58 others in a rare announcement acknowledging casualties. He announced that they had been killed in Kherson by Ukrainian artillery attacks in the region. In late October, Ukrainian Chief of Intelligence Maj. Gen. Kyrylo Budanov said that at least 40,000 Russian forces were present on Kherson including Naval Infantry, Special forces and VDV Airborne troops.

November

On 9 November, Ukrainian forces were close to entering Snihurivka; Russia announced the withdrawal of its troops from Kherson and the right bank of the Dnieper.

On 10 November, a video emerged appearing to show the Ukrainian flag flying in Snihurivka. Ukrainian forces had also regained control of the village of Kyselivka, fifteen kilometers northwest of Kherson. On the same day, Commander-in-Chief of the Armed Forces of Ukraine Valerii Zaluzhnyi stated that Ukrainian forces have taken back 41 settlements in the Kherson direction since 1 October.

On 11 November, Ukrainian troops entered the city of Kherson. The troops were met by crowds chanting "Slava Ukraini!" and "ZSU!" (Zbroini syly Ukrainy, Armed Forces of Ukraine).

Aftermath

After the recapture of Kherson, Ukraine continued offensive military operations in the area. On 12 November, a video allegedly showed Ukrainian special forces crossing the Dnieper–Bug estuary in speedboats and attacking Russian forces stationed on the Kinburn Peninsula. On the same day, the Russian occupation authorities announced that they were preparing to leave the town of Nova Kakhovka, located on the east bank of the Dnieper River. The following day, Russian media reported that 20 Ukrainian "saboteurs" from the country's armed forces and four vessels had been destroyed in an attempt to land in Pokrovske on the Kinburn Peninsula.

On 13 November, the administration of the Kherson Oblast called on Kherson residents and residents of other recently liberated areas on the right bank of the Dnieper to evacuate to safer parts of the country due to fears that Russian forces could "begin fighting against the civilian population". During Zelenskyy's speech in Kherson on 14 November, the NOS described the situation on the ground as "a sort of unspoken ceasefire", and that "both belligerents had taken a kind of break and were not extensively shooting at each other." Russian forces were still close by on the eastern river bank, and Kherson city continued to face medicine shortages, and heavily damaged communications, water supply, heating and electricity networks.

According to Ukraine’s Operational Command South, on 15 November Ukrainian rocket and artillery units attacked Russian positions on the left bank of the Dnieper River and in the area of the Kinburn Spit.

Throughout the course of Ukraine's counteroffensive, they had liberated the island of Ostriv Velykyi Potomkin in November. On 9 December, some Ukrainian officials, such as presidential advisor Oleksii Arestovych and Lieutenant Colonel Konstiantyn Mashovets, as well as some unofficial Russian sources, claimed that Russian forces, specifically the 80th Arctic Motor Rifle Brigade, 25th Spetsnaz Regiment, and 4th BARS Special Combat Army Reserve, had re-occupied the island following a successful amphibious operation. Contradicting Khlan, the General Staff of the Ukrainian Armed Forces claimed on 15 December that Russia had begun forcibly deporting civilians from Ostriv Velykyi Potomkin, indicating that Russian forces controlled the island.

Analysis 
On 10 September 2022, Taras Berezovets stated that the southern counteroffensive had been part of a "disinformation campaign" to distract Russia from the real counteroffensive being prepared in the Kharkiv oblast. The Institute for the Study of War analyzed that Russian forces began moving equipment from the eastern frontlines to those in the south in order to prepare for the impending counteroffensive. Thus, Russian frontlines in Kharkiv oblast were left relatively unprotected to Ukrainian advances.

On 24 September 2022, The New York Times reported that Ukrainian commanders and servicemen acknowledged suffering heavy losses during the Kherson offensive, mostly caused by  lack of ammunition, strong Russian defenses and the role of Russian artillery. Ukrainian colonel Vadym Sukharevsky credited part of Ukraine's victory in Kherson to the artillery systems, guided munitions and long-range rocket launchers sent by Western partner countries for an article by The Washington Post.

Following the liberation of Kherson, the Institute for the Study of War argued that "Russia’s withdrawal from Kherson City is igniting an ideological fracture between pro-war figures and Russian President Vladimir Putin, eroding confidence in Putin’s commitment and ability to deliver his war promises", noting criticism toward the Russian government from nationalist figures such as Aleksandr Dugin, Igor "Strelkov" Girkin and the Wagner Group; the ISW also noted how "Russian military leadership is trying and largely failing to integrate combat forces drawn from many different organizations and of many different types and levels of skill and equipment into a more cohesive fighting force in Ukraine", especially noting the lack of organization of military forces coming from Donetsk People's Republic and Luhansk People's Republic.

See also 

 2022 Ukrainian eastern counteroffensive
 Battle of Kherson
 Liberation of Kherson
 Russian occupation of Kherson Oblast
 Battle of Melitopol
 Russian occupation of Zaporizhzhia Oblast
 Battle of Mykolaiv
 Russian occupation of Mykolaiv Oblast
 2022 Crimea attacks

References 

Battles of the 2022 Russian invasion of Ukraine

August 2022 events in Ukraine
September 2022 events in Ukraine
October 2022 events in Ukraine
November 2022 events in Ukraine
History of Donetsk Oblast
History of Kharkiv Oblast
History of Kherson Oblast
History of Mykolaiv Oblast